Treaty of Hamburg may refer to:

Treaty of Hamburg (1638)
Treaty of Hamburg (1701)
Treaty of Hamburg (1762)